Convoy is an American trucking software company co-founded by CEO Dan Lewis and CTO Grant Goodale.

On 25 July 2017, the company raised $62 million in Series B funding, led by Y Combinator's Continuity Fund. Other new investors included Cascade Investment CEO Bill Gates,  Mosaic Ventures, former U.S. Senator Bill Bradley, and Barry Diller. This round of funding brought Convoy's total amount raised to $80 million.

They joined existing Convoy investors Greylock Partners (the VC fund of LinkedIn co-founder Reid Hoffman), Salesforce CEO Marc Benioff, Amazon founder Jeff Bezos via Bezos Expeditions, former Starbucks President Howard Behar, Code.org founders Hadi and Ali Partovi, and the founders & CEOs of eBay, Instagram, KKR, and Dropbox, among others. 

Convoy was awarded GeekWire's 2017 Startup of the Year.

In 2018, Convoy raised $185 million led by CapitalG at a $1 billion valuation.

In 2019, Convoy raised $400 million, led by Generation Investment Management and T. Rowe Price at a $2.75 billion valuation.

References

External links

Companies based in Seattle
Privately held companies of the United States
Software companies established in 2015
Software companies of the United States